Jon Hui-jong (5 March 1930 – 22 September 2020) was a North Korean politician and diplomat.

Career
In 1968 he was temporarily the  Chargé d'Affaires ad interim for the North korean embassy in cambodia.In 1972 he was the Chargé d'Affaires ad interim for Angola and Zaire.In 2001 he was the ambassador for north korea in Egypt.

Honours
He received the Order of Kim Jong-il in 2012.

References

1930 births
2020 deaths
North Korean politicians
People from Kangwon Province (North Korea)